The 1914 All England Open Badminton Championships was a badminton tournament held at the Royal Horticultural Hall, Westminster, England from 3 March to 8 March 1914.

It would be the last Championship before being suspended for the duration of World War I. Defending champion Guy Sautter continued to play under the alias of U N Lappin and successfully defended his title. Lavinia Radeglia emulated Sautter by retaining her women's singles title.

In the Men's doubles Frank Chesterton & George Thomas retained the title. The instances of an alias being used continued, in addition to Sautter playing as Lappin, Archibald Engelbach played as A. Fee.

Final results

Men's singles
There were four first round matches - Sautter bt R. M. McCallum 15–3, 15–12, Chesterton bt Henry Hosken 15–12, 15–8, Smith bt William Hockin 15–12, 15-5 and Hawthorn bt G. M. Hill 15–9, 15–9.

Women's singles

Men's doubles

+ alias

Women's doubles

Mixed doubles
There were three first round matches - McCallum & Drake bt Charles Pierson & Lydia Swete 15–5, 15–9, 
Bisgood & Gowenlock bt Inglis & Constance Pierson 18-13 15-9 and Uber & Hetley bt F. C. Lohden & Miss Drinkwater 15–9, 15–8.

References

All England Open Badminton Championships
All England
All England Open Badminton Championships in London
All England
All England Badminton Championships